Maxime Bouttier (born 22 April 1993) is a France-born Indonesian actor and model. He is known for portraying Gede in the film Ticket to Paradise (2022).

Filmography

Film

Television

References

External links

1993 births
Living people
Indonesian male film actors
Indonesian male television actors
Indonesian male models
Indonesian people of French descent
French emigrants to Indonesia